Battersby's emo skink (Emoia battersbyi) is a species of lizard in the family Scincidae. The species is native to Oceania and Southeast Asia.

Etymology
The specific name, battersbyi, is in honour of British herpetologist James Clarence Battersby (1901–1993).

The synonym, Lygosoma ahli, is in honour of German zoologist Ernst Ahl.

Geographic range
E. battersbyi is found in Indonesia and Papua New Guinea.

Habitat

Reproduction
E. battersbyi is oviparous.

References

Further reading
Procter JB (1923). "On New and Rare Reptiles and Batrachians from the Australian Region". Proceedings of the Zoological Society of London 1923: 1069–1077. ("Lygosoma (Emoa) battersbyi ", new species, p. 1770, Figures 3a–3c).
Shea GM (2016). "Emoia ahli (Vogt, 1932), a synonym of Emoia battersbyi (Procter, 1923) (Squamata: Scincidae)". Amphibia-Reptilia 37 (3): 315–319.
Vogt T (1932). "Beitrag zur Reptilienfauna der ehemaligen Kolonie Deutsch-Neuguinea". Sitzungsberichte der Gesellschaft Naturforschender Freunde zu Berlin 5–7: 281–294. (Lygosoma ahli, new species, p. 291). (in German).

Emoia
Reptiles described in 1923
Taxa named by Joan Beauchamp Procter